Shingkhar Gewog (Dzongkha: ཤིང་མཁར་) is a gewog (village block) of Zhemgang District, Bhutan.

References

Gewogs of Bhutan
Zhemgang District